is the pseudonym of a Japanese author.  Nakamura came to international attention when he won the 2010 Kenzaburō Ōe Prize for his novel, The Thief (掏摸, "Pickpocket"). The English translation of the novel was well received.

Works in English translation
The Thief (掏摸 Suri), trans. Satoko Izumo and Stephen Coates (Soho Crime, 2012)
Evil and the Mask (悪と仮面のルール Aku to kamen no rūru), trans. Satoko Izumo and Stephen Coates (Soho Crime, 2013)
Last Winter, We Parted (去年の冬、きみと別れ Kyonen no fuyu, kimi to wakare), trans. Allison Markin Powell (Soho Press, 2014)
The Gun (銃 Jū), trans. Allison Markin Powell (Soho Press, 2016)
The Kingdom (王国 Ōkoku), trans. Kalau Almony (Soho Press, 2016)
The Boy in the Earth (土の中の子供 Tsuchi no naka no kodomo), trans. Allison Markin Powell
Cult X (教団X Kyōdan X), trans. Kalau Almony (Soho Press, 2018)
My Annihilation (私の消滅 Watashi no Shōmetsu), trans. Sam Bett (Soho Crime, 2022)

Reception
In 2018, The Gun was adapted as a feature film, screenwritten and directed by Masaharu Take.

The Wall Street Journal called The Thief a "chilling philosophical thriller" and included it in its Best Fiction of 2012, while Time Out Chicago called the novel a "breath of fresh air." The novel was also a finalist for the 2012 Los Angeles Times Book Prize in the Best Mystery/Thriller category.

The book, though marketed as crime fiction, was cited by some reviewers as being a work of literary fiction.

Awards and nominations
Japanese Awards
 2002 – Shincho Prize for New Writers: Jū (The Gun )
 2004 – Noma Literary Prize for New Writers: Shakō (Shield Me from the Light )
 2005 – Akutagawa Prize: Tsuchi no Naka no Kodomo (Child in the Ground)
 2010 – Ōe Kenzaburō Prize: The Thief

U.S. Awards
 2012 – Nominee for Los Angeles Times Book Prize for Mystery/thriller: The Thief
 2014 – David Goodis Award

Bibliography

Novels
, 2003 (The Gun, Soho Press, 2015)
 [Shield Me from the Light], 2004
 [A Note of Malice], 2005
, 2005 (The Boy in the Earth, Soho Press, 2017)
 [Final Life], 2007
 [In the Night I Feel Everything Melancholy], 2009
, 2009 (The Thief, Soho Press, 2012), ("دزد" [in Persian], Qoqnoos publication, Iran, 2015)
, 2010 (Evil and the Mask, Soho Press, 2013)
, 2011 (The Kingdom, Soho Press, 2016)
 [The Labyrinth], 2012
, 2013 (Last Winter, We Parted, Soho Press, 2014)
, 2014 [Cult X, Soho Press, 2018]
 [On the Night You Disappeared], 2015
 [My Annihilation], 2016
 [Empire R], 2017

Short story collections
[Child in the Ground], 2005
, 2005
[The Voice of a Spider], 2004
[The Edge of the World], 2009
[Child under the Moon], 2008
[The Garbage Room], 2008
[The Day worthy of the War], 2006
[Noises in the Night], 2007
, 2006
[The Woods of a Delusion: 50 Stories], 2012
A, 2014

References

External links
 J'Lit | Authors : Fuminori Nakamura | Books from Japan 
English Language Profile & Interview 

21st-century Japanese novelists
1977 births
Living people
Japanese crime fiction writers
Akutagawa Prize winners